LeRoy is a city in Coffey County, Kansas, United States.  As of the 2020 census, the population of the city was 451.

History
LeRoy was founded in 1855. It was named after the city of Le Roy, Illinois.

The first post office in LeRoy (a name also spelled historically as Leroy) was established in 1856.

During the Civil War the town had a military post from 1861 to 1864. LeRoy's post was one of a number of posts in eastern Kansas that existed to guard against Confederate guerrilla attacks and attacks by unfriendly Indians. On May 22, 1862, the 1st Regiment, Indian Home Guard was organized at Le Roy.

Geography
LeRoy is located at  (38.083958, -95.633139).

Climate
The climate in this area is characterized by hot, humid summers and generally mild to cool winters.  According to the Köppen Climate Classification system, LeRoy has a humid subtropical climate, abbreviated "Cfa" on climate maps.

Demographics

2010 census
As of the census of 2010, there were 561 people, 230 households, and 156 families residing in the city. The racial makeup of the city was 97.9% White, 0.2% Native American, 0.2% Asian, and 1.8% from two or more races. Hispanic or Latino of any race were 1.6% of the population.

There were 230 households, of which 33.0% had children under the age of 18 living with them, 53.5% were married couples living together, 10.9% had a female householder with no husband present, 3.5% had a male householder with no wife present, and 32.2% were non-families. 29.1% of all households were made up of individuals, and 10.4% had someone living alone who was 65 years of age or older. The average household size was 2.44 and the average family size was 2.99.

The median age in the city was 40.9 years. 26.2% of residents were under the age of 18; 6.1% were between the ages of 18 and 24; 22% were from 25 to 44; 29.8% were from 45 to 64; and 15.9% were 65 years of age or older. The gender makeup of the city was 50.4% male and 49.6% female.

2000 census
As of the census of 2000, there were 593 people, 239 households, and 162 families residing in the city. The racial makeup of the city was 97.13% White, 0.17% Native American, and 2.70% from two or more races. Hispanic or Latino of any race were 1.01% of the population.

There were 239 households, out of which 33.5% had children under the age of 18 living with them, 54.4% were married couples living together, 9.6% had a female householder with no husband present, and 32.2% were non-families. 29.3% of all households were made up of individuals, and 14.2% had someone living alone who was 65 years of age or older. The average household size was 2.48 and the average family size was 3.06.

In the city, the population was spread out, with 28.3% under the age of 18, 7.3% from 18 to 24, 30.0% from 25 to 44, 20.7% from 45 to 64, and 13.7% who were 65 years of age or older. The median age was 36 years. For every 100 females, there were 96.4 males. For every 100 females age 18 and over, there were 90.6 males.

The median income for a household in the city was $30,341, and the median income for a family was $39,375. Males had a median income of $25,469 versus $19,886 for females. The per capita income for the city was $15,034. About 6.6% of families and 10.3% of the population were below the poverty line, including 11.5% of those under age 18 and 15.8% of those age 65 or over.

Education
LeRoy is served by USD 245 Southern Coffey County. School unification consolidated LeRoy and Gridley schools forming Southern Coffey County Middle School and High School in 2003. The Southern Coffey County High School mascot is Titans.

LeRoy High School was closed through school unification. The LeRoy High School mascot was LeRoy Bluejays.

Notable person
 Bill Otto, Kansas State Representative

See also
 Great Flood of 1951

References

Further reading

External links
 City of LeRoy
 LeRoy - Directory of Public Officials
 USD 245, local school district
 LeRoy city map, KDOT

Cities in Kansas
Cities in Coffey County, Kansas
1855 establishments in Kansas Territory